This is a list of schools in Bangladesh. The syllabus most common in usage is the National Curriculum and Textbooks, which has two versions, a Bengali version and an English version. Edexcel and Cambridge syllabus are used for most of the English-medium schools. Other syllabi are also used, although rarely.

Barisal Division

Chittagong Division

Comilla District

Dhaka Division

Khulna Division

Rajshahi Division

Rangpur Division

Sylhet Division

See also
 List of colleges in Bangladesh

References

External links